{|

{{Infobox ship characteristics
|Hide header=
|Header caption=
|Ship class=Ada-class corvette
|Ship displacement=2,300 tonnes
|Ship length=
|Ship beam= 
|Ship height=
|Ship draught=
|Ship power=30,000 kW (CODAG)
|Ship propulsion=1 gas turbine, 2 diesels, 2 shafts
|Ship sail plan=
|Ship speed=*Economy 
Maximum 
|Ship range= at 15 knots
|Ship endurance=*21 days with logistic support
10 days autonomous
|Ship complement=93 including aviation officers, with accommodation for up to 106
|Ship sensors=*GENESIS CMS
SMART-S Mk2 search radar
Sonar, GPS, LAN, ECDIS
UniMACS 3000 IPMS
X-band radar, Fire control radar
|Ship EW=Aselsan ARES-2N
Others: Laser/RF systems, ASW jammers, SSTD
|Ship armament=*Guns:
 1 × 76 mm OtoMelara Super Rapid
 2 × 20 mm Aselsan STAMP
Anti-surface missiles:
 8 × Harpoon Block II SSM BB
Anti-aircraft missiles:
 21 × RAM (PDMS)Torpedoes:
 2 × 324 mm Mk.32 triple launchers for Mk.46 torpedoes
|Ship armour=
|Ship armor=
|Ship aircraft=
|Ship aircraft facilities=*Hangar and platform for:
 S-70B Seahawk ASW helicopters
 Unmanned aerial vehicles (UAV)
|Ship notes=Capability of storing armaments, 20 tons of JP-5 aircraft fuel, aerial refueling (HIRF) and maintenance systems
}}
|}

TCG Büyükada (F-512) is the second ship of the  ASW corvettes of the Turkish Navy. TCG Büyükada'' was named after Büyükada Island. Büyükada Island is part of the Prince Islands archipelago in the Sea of Marmara, to the southeast of Istanbul.

Designed, developed and built by the Tuzla (Istanbul) Naval Shipyard as a part of the MILGEM project, it was laid down on 22 January 2008, launched on 27 September 2011, and commissioned on 27 September 2013.

History 
In 2015, she completed a three-month voyage, visiting ports in Saudi Arabia, Yemen, Pakistan, Qatar, Kuwait, Bahrain, Sudan and Djibouti. She was involved in the successful evacuation of 55 Turkish citizens from Yemen.

References and notes

External links
Undersecretariat for Defence Industries official website
TCG Büyükada Sighted On Bosphorus - 25 Jul 2013

Ada-class corvettes of the Turkish Navy
Ships built at Istanbul Naval Shipyard
2011 ships